The Candlelight Years is an Opeth box set compiling their first three albums Orchid, Morningrise, and My Arms, Your Hearse, originally released on Candlelight Records. Although the albums have been released (and even re-released) before, this was the first time they have been collected in one set. It also marks the first time the albums were released in Japan.

The box set was released on June 28, 2008, and is presented in fold-out digipak packaging. This edition was limited to 2000 copies. The set was re-released on August 25, 2009, in a standard 3-disc jewel casing.

Track listing

Orchid
 "In Mist She Was Standing"  – 14:09
 "Under the Weeping Moon"  – 9:52
 "Silhouette"  – 3:07
 "Forest of October"  – 13:04
 "The Twilight Is My Robe"  – 11:03
 "Requiem"  – 1:11
 "The Apostle in Triumph"  – 13:01
 "Into the Frost of Winter" (bonus demo track) – 6:20

Morningrise
 "Advent"  – 13:45
 "The Night and the Silent Water"  – 11:00
 "Nectar"  – 10:09
 "Black Rose Immortal"  – 20:14
 "To Bid You Farewell"  – 10:57
 "Eternal Soul Torture" (bonus demo track)  – 8:35

My Arms, Your Hearse
 "Prologue"  – 1:01
 "April Ethereal"  – 8:41
 "When"  – 9:14
 "Madrigal"  – 1:26
 "The Amen Corner"  – 8:43
 "Demon of the Fall"  – 6:13
 "Credence"  – 5:26
 "Karma"  – 7:52
 "Epilogue"  – 3:59
 "Circle of the Tyrants" (bonus Celtic Frost cover)  – 5:12
 "Remember Tomorrow" (bonus Iron Maiden cover)  – 5:00

Personnel

Orchid and Morningrise
 Mikael Åkerfeldt – vocals, guitar, acoustic guitar
 Peter Lindgren – guitar, acoustic guitar
 Johan De Farfalla – bass guitar, backing vocals
 Anders Nordin – drums, percussion, piano

My Arms, Your Hearse
 Mikael Åkerfeldt – vocals, guitar, bass guitar
 Peter Lindgren – guitar
 Martin Lopez – drums
 Fredrik Nordström – engineering, production, Hammond organ (on "Epilogue")
 Anders Fridén – co-production

References

Opeth albums
2008 compilation albums